Ivan Sergeyev (born 22 January 1988)  is a retired professional Ukrainian tennis player who reached a highest singles ranking of world No. 147 in August 2010.

Performance timeline

Singles

ATP Challenger and ITF Futures finals

Singles: 21 (11–10)

Doubles: 12 (7–5)

References

External links
 
 
 

Ukrainian male tennis players
Universiade medalists in tennis
Sportspeople from Dnipro
Living people
1988 births
Universiade silver medalists for Ukraine
Medalists at the 2009 Summer Universiade